Edward Walker (born 1970) is a Republican member of the Montana Legislature.  He was elected for Senate District 29, representing Billings, Montana, in 2010.  Walker received a Bachelor's in Economics from Montana State University and a Master's in Public Policy from the University of Denver.

References

External links
 Home page

Living people
Republican Party Montana state senators
Politicians from Billings, Montana
Montana State University alumni
University of Denver alumni
1969 births